Lieblingminne und Freundesliebe in der Weltliteratur is an anthology of poetry about homosexuality, compiled by the German artist Elisar von Kupffer (Elisarion). First published in 1900, it is the first effort of its kind in modern times, and while several later works have tried to deliver an updated version of von Kupffer's book, it has proven to be a timeless piece of gay literature.

Poems
Poems in the book come from a variety of sources and places, like Ancient Greece, the Roman Empire, the Bible, the Arab world, Japan, Renaissance Italy, Elizabethan England, and 19th-century Germany, even including a few poems by the editor himself.

At the time of writing, no previous compilations existed, so finding out what to include required a lot of research. Compounding this was the fact that often, existing translations of the poems were either nonexistent or mangled by homophobic censoring (for example, replacement of male pronouns with female ones). Thus, von Kupffer had to translate many of the poems first, also enlisting the help of friends for languages which he could not handle.

In light of the difficulties, it must be observed that von Kupffer's selection has prevailed with most of the authors and poems he selected becoming a permanent part of the canon of gay poetry and also being included in later similar works.

Title
The title of the book uses an existing German word—Freundesliebe, "love between friends"—and a concoction by von Kupffer, Lieblingminne (either "preferred form of love" or "love of a favorite"). Supposedly, Lieblingminne means the Greek form of pederastic relationships and Freundesliebe the homosocial bonding between men of comparable age.

The word Minne, coming from medieval German times, usually denotes a form of heterosexual platonic love in which the lover sings praise of the beloved but does not make any concrete sexual advances.

Von Kupffer's argumentation in the preface
Perhaps of equal interest as the anthology itself may be the politically charged preface by von Kupffer, written in 1899 in Pompeii. In it, von Kupffer argues in favor of a homosexuality that is not just tolerated by society, but is an integral part of the social fabric, and with its (largely platonic) homosocial bonds between boys and men, as well as men and men, strengthens society in a way that heterosexual relationships on their own could never hope to do.

Von Kupffer also attacks the notion of a third sex, a concept he claims was invented by homosexual rights activists like Magnus Hirschfeld as a way to gain legal recognition for homosexuals and to repeal existing anti-sodomy laws. He is also strongly opposed to any revisionist history where historical figures like Alexander the Great or Julius Caesar are depicted as gays, when he feels the modern notion of "gay" hinges on a feminized, third-sex model of male behavior that he contends did not apply at the time.

Von Kupffer goes on to criticize the "cult of the woman", which he claims comes from imperial France and the court of Louis XIV. He states that a social climate in which  males and females are primarily encouraged to form bonds and male–male bonding is watched with suspicion is detrimental to society. The promotion of heterosexuality above everything else can, by his account, only lead to a comparatively lonely society, where social interactions and culture on a larger scale (as in the Greek poleis) is mostly missing.

However, despite his argument that present-day men should, like the ideal Greek citizen of the past, be both decidedly masculine in their behavior but at the same time refined enough to entertain homoerotic or homosexual relationships, von Kupffer stresses that he is not a misogynist and that in fact, a lot of misogyny emanates from heterosexual men who subconsciously feel caged in by their marriages.

In many ways, this preface by von Kupffer remains relevant today, as the argument between von Kupffer and Hirschfeld mirrors later similar arguments, e.g. between Adolf Brand and Hirschfeld, or since the 1960s, between advocates of pederastic relationships and the mainstream gay liberation movement.

Publication history of the book
The book was published in an edition of 1000 copies by Adolf Brand, the pioneer activist for the acceptance of male homosexuality, but already at the end of 1900, the remaining books were bought by the publisher S. Dyck in Eberswalde, which is shown by the ticket on Brand's name on the title page. In 1903, the book was taken over by the gay-friendly publisher Max Spohr, who exchanged Brand's title page for one bearing his own name. For a short time, the book was even banned by the courts, but later reinstated due to a favorable deposition by Ulrich von Wilamowitz-Moellendorff.

Only very few originals have survived the two world wars and it is therefore difficult to find them in libraries. In 1995, the Berlin publishing house Verlag Rosa Winkel published a facsimile edition (somewhat reduced in page size in comparison to the original) of the book owned by the Staatliche Bibliothek Passau, with an introduction by Marita Keilson-Lauritz.

Further reading

Facsimile edition of the book
 von Kupffer, Elisar: Lieblingminne und Freundesliebe In der Weltliteratur. Eine Sammlung mit einer ethisch-politischen Einleitung von Elisarion von Kupffer. Nachdruck der Ausgabe von 1900 mit einem Vorwort von Marita Keilson-Lauritz. Verlag Rosa Winkel, Berlin 1995.

Other similar anthologies
 Carpenter, Edward, ed.: Iolaus - anthology  of friendship.  London, Swan Sonnenschein / Manchester, S. Clarke.  (Second edition, 1906, third Edition 1927).
 Beurdeley, Cecile, ed.: L'Amour bleu, 1978.  — Hefty volume, which, besides poetry, also contains selected prose as well as many paintings and photographs.
 Campe, Joachim, ed.: Matrosen sind der Liebe Schwingen. Insel Verlag, 1994.  — places higher emphasis on modern authors
 Sutherland, Alistair. & Anderson, Patrick, eds.: Eros - an anthology of male friendship.  Blond, 1961.
 Reade, Brian, ed.:  Sexual Heretics; Male  Homosexuality in English literature from 1850-1900 - an anthology. Routledge, Keegan and Paul, 1970.
 Coote, Stephen, ed.: The Penguin Book of Homosexual Verse. Penguin, 1983.

See also
 Straton of Sardis

External links
 Review of the book and its history 

1900 poetry books
1900 anthologies
Poetry anthologies
LGBT poetry
1900s LGBT literature
LGBT literature in Germany
German anthologies
LGBT anthologies